Ukrainian Championship may refer to:
 Ukrainian Chess Championship, a Ukrainian national chess competition
 Ukrainian Premier League, a Ukrainian football league
 Ukrainian Hockey Championship, the national championship tournament of Ukrainian ice hockey
 Professional Hockey League, a Ukrainian hockey league